Didion is a genus of dusky lady beetles in the family Coccinellidae. There are at least three described species in Didion.

Species
These three species belong to the genus Didion:
 Didion longulum Casey, 1899 i c g b
 Didion nanum (LeConte, 1852) i c g
 Didion punctatum (Melsheimer, 1847) i c g b (twice-stained ladybug)
Data sources: i = ITIS, c = Catalogue of Life, g = GBIF, b = Bugguide.net

References

Further reading

 
 
 
 
 
 
 
 
 

Coccinellidae